Tatry may refer to:
 Tatry, native name of Tatra Mountains
 1989 Tatry, a carbonaceous Vestian asteroid and tumbling slow rotator
 Tatry Airport, an airport in the Slovak ski resort town of Poprad
 Tatry Running Tour, a stage structured trail running competition